The Indian general election, 2009 in Maharashtra were held for 48 seats with the state going to polls in the first three phases of the general elections. The major contenders in the state were the United Progressive Alliance (UPA) and National Democratic Alliance (NDA). UPA consisted of the Indian National Congress and the Nationalist Congress Party whereas the NDA consisted of the Bharatiya Janata Party and the Shiv Sena. The Shiv Sena contested on 22 seats in the state and the BJP over 25 seats
. Similarly, the NCP contested on 21 seats and the Indian National Congress contested on 25 seats
. Other parties in the fray included the Maharashtra Navnirman Sena (MNS), Bahujan Samaj Party which fielded candidates on 47 seats, and the Fourth Front. The MNS which was contesting its first general elections fielded candidates on 11 seats in the state.

Voting and results
Source: Election Commission of India

Results by Alliance

List of Elected MPs

List of all elected Indian National Congress MPs

List of all elected Nationalist Congress Party MPs

List of all elected Shiv Sena MPs

List of all elected Bharatiya Janata Party MPs

Region-wise Breakup

Western Maharashtra

Vidarbha

Marathwada

Thane+Konkan

Mumbai

North Maharashtra

References

Indian general elections in Maharashtra
2000s in Maharashtra
Maharashtra